The Raftsmen was a Canadian folk music group, active through the 1960s, which performed Canadian and traditional folk songs. They collectively played 15 different instruments, including guitar, banjo and percussion, and sang songs in 13 languages.

History
The Raftsmen was formed by Louis Leroux, Martin Overland and Marvin Burke.  Overland had been the lead singer/guitarist/music arranger for the 1950s Montreal trio The Strangers, along with his sister Arlene on claves and drummer Leon Segal.

The band made a number of recordings for RCA (RCA Camden in the United States), and performed in both Miami and Montreal in 1962. In 1963 they also recorded an album in Montreal, A Night at Le Pavillon, based on a live folk performance. That year, the band performed on Let's Sing Out, a CTV Television Network series hosted by folk singer Oscar Brand. The band recorded a track for the RCA Victor compilation album All-Star All-Time Folk Festival.

In 1964 the group were guests on Brand's radio show in Montreal. The Raftsmen's single (on Apex Records) of Brand’s "Something to Sing About" sold nationally and appeared on local radio charts during the time period leading up to the Canadian centennial in 1967.

Overland and Burke later left the band, and Leroux, bassist Guy Pilette, and 12-string guitarist and arranger Donald Steven, formed a successor band known as The New Raftsmen and The Raftsmen III. This group toured and performed primarily in Eastern Canada and recorded for Banff, Rodeo, Melbourne and 20th Century Fox Records.  Its single of Gordon Lightfoot’s "The Hands I Love" (known also as "Song for a Winter's Night") received considerable air play.

Leroux later toured with Nana Mouskouri for the better part of ten years, then became a Latin guitar player in session work and released a pair of instrumental solo albums.  He subsequently taught flamenco-style guitar technique.

Discography

Albums
 Down in the Valley, 1961, RCA Victor
 This Land Is Your Land, 1963, RCA Camden
 The Raftsmen, 1963, Canadian Talent Library
 Here and There With the Raftsmen, 1964, RCA Victor
 A Night At Le Pavillon, 1965, RCA
 On Target (as The Raftsmen III), 1967, Banff Records
 The Raftsmen, 1967, Rodeo Records

Singles
 "Yellow Bird" (Choucounne) (P'tits Oiseaux)/"Shame and Scandal" (7"), 1961, RCA Victor
 "Last Night I Had the Strangest Dream"/"Walking on the Green Grass", 1962, RCA Victor
 "Down in the Valley"/"Tarrytown", 1962, RCA Victor
 "The Drinkin' Gourd"/"Rubbery Scrubbedy", 1962, RCA Victor
 "Aye, Pepina"/"Pour Toi Seule", 1964, Apex
 "Something To Sing About"/" Kelligrew's Soiree", 1964, Apex 
 "Hands I Love"/"Haunted House", 1967, Melbourne Records & 20th Century Fox
 "Song For A Nation"/"Goodbye To All My Dreams", 1968, Melbourne Records

References

External links
 The Raftsmen at VH1.com
 Gordon Lightfoot - Covers by Song
 The Raftsmen at itcamefromcanada.com
 The Raftsmen music "Down in the Valley"
  canadianbands.com

Canadian folk music groups